The University of Washington School of Pharmacy was founded in 1894 and included four women in its inaugural class of students. It is one of two PharmD granting institutions within the state of Washington. Offices are located within the Warren G. Magnuson Health Sciences Building on the University of Washington campus. U.S. News & World Report ranked the School of Pharmacy as tied for the seventh-best pharmacy school in the United States in 2020.

Peggy Soule Odegard became interim dean of the school in 2022.

As of 2015, the school has 381 PharmD students, 59 PhD students, and 40 Masters of Science students and is 64% female.

See also
Washington State University College of Pharmacy
and

References

External links
University of Washington School of Pharmacy

Pharmacy
Educational institutions established in 1894
1894 establishments in Washington (state)
Pharmacy schools in Washington (state)